John Cary Mykkanen  (born September 8, 1966) is an American former competition swimmer who won the silver medal in the men's 400-meter freestyle event at the 1984 Summer Olympics in Los Angeles, California.  He finished second behind American teammate George DiCarlo.

See also
 List of Olympic medalists in swimming (men)

References
 

1966 births
Living people
American male freestyle swimmers
American people of Finnish descent
California Golden Bears men's swimmers
Olympic silver medalists for the United States in swimming
Sportspeople from Anaheim, California
Swimmers at the 1984 Summer Olympics
Medalists at the 1984 Summer Olympics
Universiade medalists in swimming
Universiade silver medalists for the United States
Medalists at the 1985 Summer Universiade